Steven Neal Barton (June 26, 1954 – July 21, 2001) was an American actor, singer, dancer, teacher, choreographer, and stage director, who worked in English and German-language productions.

Biography 
Steven Neal Barton was born on June 26, 1954, in Hot Springs, Arkansas, the youngest of three children of Tom and Mary Barton. He was raised in Nederland, Texas.

He won a scholarship to the University of Texas at Austin (UT), where he majored in theater, dance and voice, and appeared in over 30 productions with UT and the Ballet of Austin. A UT endowed Presidential Scholarship is now named for him.  After graduation he went to Europe and landed his first professional role in St. Gallen, Switzerland, then performed in several major Swiss, German and Austrian theater companies.

He played leading roles in West Side Story, Godspell, Romeo and Juliet, The Fantasticks, The Threepenny Opera, Oklahoma!, Jesus Christ Superstar, Evita, Guys and Dolls, and Camelot, before playing the role of Munkustrap in the original Vienna cast of Cats, at the Theater an der Wien. At the Theater des Westens in Berlin he played roles in Guys and Dolls, Jesus Christ Superstar (as Jesus), La Cage aux Folles (as both Jean Michel and Albin/Zaza) and Robert in Company.  In 1986 he originated the role of Raoul in Andrew Lloyd Webber's The Phantom of the Opera in London, and in 1988 reprised that role in the original Broadway cast.

Barton was married to swing dancer and choreographer Denny Berry, who served as dance supervisor for the North American productions of The Phantom of the Opera, whom he met at college. A son, Edward, was born in Vienna in 1984; the couple separated at an unspecified later date. He was an Honorary Chairperson of the Steadman Hawkins Sports Medicine Foundation and an honorary member of the UTA Board of Education.

In 1996 Barton returned to Vienna, where he took over the part of the Beast in Disney's Beauty and the Beast. In his final project, he originated the role of Graf von Krolock, a vampire in Jim Steinman's Tanz der Vampire, for which he won an IMAGE (International Music Award Germany) in 1998.  Barton celebrated his 30-year onstage anniversary in 1997 during his run as von Krolock.

Death
Barton had, in the last years of his life, been battling with alcoholism and addiction to painkillers following chronic knee problems and had, only months before his death, started treatment for bipolar disorder.  He was found dead at his apartment in Bremen, Germany on July 21, 2001 aged 47.  While his death was initially attributed to heart failure, according to obituary information released by the press office for the New York production of The Phantom of the Opera, it was later ruled a suicide by the district attorney in Bremen after an empty bottle of prescription heart medication was found at the scene.

Stage roles 
 Broadway
 The Phantom of the Opera, Original Cast, (1988) as Raoul(1990) as The Phantom
 The Red Shoes, as Boris Lermontov, (1993)
 International
 Cats, 1983 and 1984, in Vienna, Austria, (as Munkustrap/Dance Captain)
Company, 1986, in Berlin, Germany, (as Robert)
 The Phantom of the Opera, 1986, in London, UK, (as Raoul, u/s The Phantom)
 Die Schöne und das Biest, 1996/97 in Vienna, Austria, (as Biest/Prinz)
 Tanz der Vampire, 1997 - 1999 in Vienna, Austria, (as Graf von Krolock)
 Regional
 The Phantom of the Opera, 1990 and 1991, Los Angeles, (as Raoul)
 The Anastasia Affaire, 1991 and 1992, (as Prince Paul)
 Six Wives, 1993, (as Henry VIII)
 Der Glöckner von Notre Dame, 1993, (as Quasimodo)
 Kiss Me, Kate, 1994, (as Fred Graham and Petruchio), Goodspeed Opera House, CT
 Sweeney Todd: The Demon Barber of Fleet Street, (as Sweeney Todd), Jan. and Feb. 1996, in Pittsburgh
 Let's Do It, a new A. R. Gurney Show with Cole Porter music and lyrics which workshopped at the Long Wharf Theater, New Haven, CT, USA, April and May 1996, (as Nick Cameron, alias the Count of Luxemburg).

Television guest roles 
 Tatort, 1992, guest role as FBI Agent Mike Haller, ORF, Austria
 The Young and the Restless, 1994, guest role and Another World, 1994, guest role as Bailey Thompson

Selected discography

Musicals 
 1983: Cats, Original Vienna Cast Recording, as Munkustrap, in German language
 1987: Highlights from The Phantom of the Opera, Original London Cast, as Raoul
 1987: The Phantom of the Opera, Original London Cast Recording, as Raoul
 1988: Show Boat, as Steve Baker
 1998: Anastasia - The Musical, as Prince Paul
 1998: Tanz der Vampire – Die Höhepunkte der Welturaufführung, Original Vienna Cast, as Graf von Krolock, in German language
 1998: Tanz der Vampire – Die Gesamtaufnahme, Original Vienna Cast Recording, as Graf von Krolock, in German language

Guest appearances 
 1985: Angelika Milster - Meisterstücke, 2 duets
 1998: Paul Schwartz's Aria, Vol. 2 - New Horizon, vocals on Leiermann
 2002: Sarah Brightman - Encore, duet on "Think of Me"

Other recordings 
 1991: Cole Porter Centennial Gala Concert
 1995: Living Water, duets with Mother Teresa and Brian Sutherland
 1999: Danke - Songs und Lieder zum Kirchentag 1999, includes the song "Reach Out", a duet with Brian Sutherland
 2002: Steve Barton – Memorial Concert, "Simply Flying" and "Somewhere Over The Rainbow"
 2004: Broadway's Fabulous Phantoms, "I've Got You Under My Skin"
 2009: Only for a While, compilation
 2010: Encore: The Private Collection, compilation of outtakes, demos and rehearsals

See also 
 Mirette on the High Wire

References

External links 
 
 Steve Barton on broadwaystars.com
 Steve Barton on Ovrtur.com *the* international database of musical theatre. http://www.ovrtur.com/biography/10128888
 Steve Barton A Life Dedicated to the Stage
 The Steve Barton Musical Theatre Project

1954 births
2001 deaths
20th-century American dancers
20th-century American male actors
20th-century American singers
20th-century American male singers
Actors from Hot Springs, Arkansas
American baritones
American choreographers
American expatriates in Austria
American expatriates in Germany
American male dancers
American male film actors
American male musical theatre actors
American musical theatre directors
Drug-related suicides in Germany
Musicians from Hot Springs, Arkansas
People from Nederland, Texas
University of Texas at Austin College of Fine Arts alumni
2001 suicides